Poeonoma is a genus of moths of the family Noctuidae.

Species
 Poeonoma acantha Tams & Bowden, 1953
 Poeonoma inermis Laporte, 1973
 Poeonoma nigribasis Laporte, 1974
 Poeonoma serrata (Hampson, 1910)
 Poeonoma similis Tams & Bowden, 1953

References
Natural History Museum Lepidoptera genus database
Poeonoma at funet

Hadeninae